Gambell School, also known as the Hugo T. Apatiki School, is a K-12 school in Gambell, Alaska. It is a part of the Bering Strait School District.

The campus of the Gambell School includes one prefabricated building with a gymnasium and two classroom wings.

History
 it had about 200 students. By 2013 the school received a $1 million grant from the federal government's School Improvement Grant (SIG).

Curriculum
 the curriculum heavily emphasizes mathematics and reading due to influences from the SIG grant, with daily emphasis on each taking up two blocks. As of that year it uses the "Success for All" teaching program and other programs used to raise test scores.

Teaching staff
 the administrative staff and the head teachers were White Americans; a lack of local Alaska natives with university educations meant that the school district recruited staff from the Lower 48. Each class had a teacher's aide who was Yupik.

Culture
The school owns trophy cases housing Alaska Native artifacts including artwork, carving, clothing, and tools.

References

External links
 Gambell School

Public K-12 schools in Alaska
Buildings and structures in Nome Census Area, Alaska
Schools in Unorganized Borough, Alaska